Movielink was a web-based video on demand (VOD) and electronic sell-through (EST) service offering movies, television shows, and other videos for rental or purchase. Movielink drew its content offerings from the libraries of Paramount Pictures, Paramount Network Television, Sony Pictures Entertainment, Metro-Goldwyn-Mayer, Universal Studios, Warner Bros. Entertainment, Buena Vista Pictures (including Miramax), Twentieth Century Fox, Twentieth Television, Koch Entertainment and others on a non-exclusive basis.  While it was only available to users in the United States, it was the first company in the world to offer legally downloadable movies from major studios.

In general, movies obtained through Movielink could only be viewed on the computer or a television set connected to the computer from which the movie was purchased.  However, consumer electronics devices such as the Xbox 360 game console also allowed users to more easily view these digital media on a traditional television screen.  Also, Movielink had deals with certain set top box companies to offer its movies downloaded directly to people's televisions(including AT&T's Homezone product). Experimentation with other business models was underway, including a feature which allowed users to purchase, download, and burn a DVD of a selected film.

History
Movielink was launched on November 11, 2002. Movielink used digital rights management software from Microsoft and RealNetworks to protect their content.  Consequently, compatibility was limited to Intel-based computers running Microsoft Windows 2000, XP, or Vista and Windows Media Player version 9 or later. They offered daily weekday specials for under 99 cents, and certain films for half price every week.

On June 1, 2006, it was revealed that Movielink's initial investors—a joint venture of Paramount, Sony, MGM, Universal, and Warner Bros—were looking to sell the company. This came shortly after numerous studios announced their intent to work with a range of potential Movielink competitors, such as Amazon.com, Apple Computer, BitTorrent Inc., Jaman, and Microsoft Xbox.

On August 8, 2007, Blockbuster purchased Movielink.  According to the 8-K filing by Blockbuster, the total purchase price was $6.6 million. The deal included content agreements thus giving Blockbuster access to one of the largest libraries of downloadable movies.  With the acquisition of Movielink, Blockbuster was positioned for media content delivery in brick and mortar rentals, DVD-by-mail, and online delivery of movies.

On December 16, 2008, the Movielink website was shut down. The site was re-directed to the Blockbuster home page. Customers were notified 30 days in advance that all movies rented or purchased prior to the shutdown date must be downloaded by no later than 12/15/08 11:59 P.M. Pacific Time.

References

Defunct video on demand services
Joint ventures
Blockbuster LLC